Pentre Bach ("Little Village") is a Welsh language television programme for young children, shown on S4C as part of the daily Planed Plant ("Children's Planet") sequence. The series is based on the characters created by Mary Vaughan Jones, the main character is Sali Mali. It first aired on 6 September 2004.

It is filmed in the village of Blaenpennal, which lies some 14 miles (22.5 km) south of Aberystwyth in Ceredigion.

Characters
Bili Bom Bom
Coblyn
Jac Do – a puppet jackdaw
Jaci Soch
Jac y Jwc
Jemeima Mop
Jini
Mrs Migl Magl
Nicw Nacw
Palu Pala
Parri Popeth
Pili Pala
Pry Bach Tew
Sali Mali – owns a café (Caffi Sali Mali)
Shoni Bric-a-moni
Siani Flewog
Tomos Caradog

External links
Official Pentre Bach website

S4C original programming
British preschool education television series
British television shows featuring puppetry
2000s British children's television series
2000s Welsh television series